Frankie James Kent (born 21 November 1995) is an English professional footballer who plays as a centre back for League One club Peterborough United.

Kent progressed through the Arsenal Academy prior to joining Colchester United's Academy for his two-year scholarship in 2012. He made his professional debut for the club in May 2014 and went on to make 141 appearances in five years with the U's. In June 2019, Kent signed for Peterborough United.

Career
Born in Romford, Kent attended Shenfield High School, with whom he won the 2008 English Schools' Football Association under-12s Schools Cup for boys. He scored in the final held at Wolverhampton Wanderers' Molineux Stadium, doubling Shenfield High's lead early in the second half.

Kent is a product of the Arsenal Academy, where he progressed through each age group from the age of seven to 16. He was released by Arsenal and went on trial at Colchester United.

Colchester United
Kent joined Colchester's Academy for his two-year scholarship in 2012. During his scholarship, Kent was named captain of the under-18 side. He was first called into the first-team squad by manager Joe Dunne in December 2013, where he was drafted in as defensive cover over the festive period after Northampton Town loanee Ben Tozer had been recalled from his loan at Colchester by his parent club. During the same season, with the under-18s,  Kent helped his side earn a league title and cup winning double. He played in the Youth Alliance Cup final held against Bradford City at Valley Parade on 29 April 2014 as the U's won the game 4–2.

Just four days after his under-18s cup triumph, Kent made his professional debut for Colchester United on 3 May 2014. He came on as a half-time substitute for Magnus Okuonghae in a 1–0 away win against Walsall.

2014–15 season
Kent made his first League One appearance of the season and his first senior start on 16 August when he replaced the suspended Magnus Okuonghae in the centre of defence for a game against Bristol City at Ashton Gate. He played the full 90 minutes as the U's succumbed to a 2–1 defeat. He was once again called upon on 13 September when he replaced Sammie Szmodics in a tactical substitution in Colchester's 2–0 victory against Leyton Orient at Brisbane Road. He replaced Szmodics prior to half-time after Magnus Okuonghae was dismissed for a serious foul on Dave Mooney. Okuonghae's ensuing four-match ban allowed Kent to make his first home start for the club on 16 September when the U's fell to a 3–2 defeat to Sheffield United, in which Colchester squandered a two-goal lead by conceding three goals in six second-half minutes. In Okuonghae's absence, Kent established himself as a first-team regular, and with his contract set to expire at the end of the season, he was rewarded with a three-and-a-half year contract extension, which he signed on 16 October 2014.

Kent once again held  a starting berth for Colchester's home clash with Chesterfield on 21 October. However, less than one minute into the game, Kent fell to the ground after being struck in the head by the ball. Meanwhile, referee Darren Sheldrake allowed play to continue, as the Spireites scored through Sam Clucas. Kent then received four minutes of treatment on the field before being replaced by Magnus Okuonghae. After being stretchered off the pitch, Kent reappeared on the sidelines before the first-half ended.

Following his injury, Kent returned to action in Colchester's 2–1 home defeat by Port Vale on 1 November. It would prove to be his last game of the season, after suffering a knee injury that ruled him out of action until March 2015. A slip in a training session in March set back his recovery, and he failed to regain fitness before the end of the campaign.

2015–16 season
Kent returned to first-team action in the 3–2 EFL Trophy defeat at Northampton Town on 1 September 2015, playing the full 90 minutes. After making 29 appearances in the 2015–16 season, Kent was named as Colchester's Young Player of the Year at the club's end of season awards on 13 May 2016.

2016–17 season
Early in the 2016–17 season, Kent was close to leaving the club on loan following his recovery from tendonitis. However, in November 2016, manager John McGreal switched tactics to utilise three central defenders, and Kent began a run of form alongside Tom Eastman and George Elokobi that would see Colchester through a nine-game unbeaten run. As a result, Kent was awarded the EFL Young Player of the Month for December. Kent was then ruled out for the remainder of the season after suffering ruptured ankle ligaments during Colchester's 2–1 win against Barnet on 11 February 2017, having made 15 first-team appearances.

2017–18 season
Kent scored his first professional goal on 9 August 2017 during Colchester's 2–1 EFL Cup defeat to Aston Villa. He also scored an own goal in the match. He then scored his first league goal on 26 August against Forest Green Rovers.

On 21 September, Kent signed a new contract to keep him with the club until summer 2020.

2018–19 season
Kent received the first red card of his career on 1 January 2019 in the 89th minute of Colchester's 2–0 defeat at Crawley Town for a second bookable offence. Having been named as Colchester United's Young Player of the Year in 2016, Kent was named the Colchester United Player of the Year for the 2018–19 season in an awards ceremony held on 29 April 2019.

Peterborough United
On 22 June 2019, Kent signed for League One side Peterborough United on a three-year contract for an undisclosed fee.

Style of play
Ex Colchester manager John McGreal, who had worked with Kent from his arrival at the club to the first-team, said of Kent:

Career statistics

Honours
Colchester United U18
2013–14 Football League Youth Alliance South East winner
2013–14 Football League Youth Alliance Cup winner

Individual
2016 Colchester United Young Player of the Year
December 2016 EFL Young Player of the Month
2019 Colchester United Player of the Year

References

External links

1995 births
Living people
Footballers from Romford
English footballers
Association football defenders
Arsenal F.C. players
Colchester United F.C. players
Peterborough United F.C. players
English Football League players